Lyco of Troas (c. 299 – c. 225 BC), son of Astyanax, was a Peripatetic philosopher and the disciple of Strato, whom he succeeded as the head of the Peripatetic school, c. 269 BC; he held that post for more than forty-four years.

Life
He resided at Pergamon, under the patronage of Eumenes I and Attalus I, from whom Antiochus II Theos in vain sought to entice him. On several occasions his counsel was of great service to the Athenians. He was celebrated for his eloquence, and for his skill in educating boys. He paid great attention to the body as well as to the mind, and, constantly practising athletic exercises, was exceedingly healthy and robust. Nevertheless, he died of gout at the age of 74. He was a bitter rival of the Peripatetic philosopher Hieronymus of Rhodes. Lyco's most notable student in the Peripatetic school was Aristo of Ceos who may have succeeded him as head of the school.

Writings
Among the writings of Lyco was probably a work On Characters (similar to the work of Theophrastus), a fragment of which is preserved by Rutilius Lupus, though the title of the book is not mentioned by any ancient writer. It appears from Cicero and Clement of Alexandria, that he wrote on the boundaries of good and evil. Apuleius suggests that he wrote a work on the nature of animals.

References

Sources

Attribution

Further reading

Hellenistic-era philosophers from Anatolia
Peripatetic philosophers
3rd-century BC Greek people
3rd-century BC philosophers
290s BC births
220s BC deaths